Equity release is a means of retaining use of a house or other asset which has capital value, while also obtaining a lump sum or a steady stream of income, using the value of the asset.

Pricing of no negative equity guarantee 
The UK Prudential Regulation Authority expressed concerns in 2018 that firms investing in ERMs should 'properly reflect' the cost of the no-negative-equity guarantee. Its consultation paper CP 13/18, published 2 July 2018, provided a benchmark for valuing the guarantee. The paper recommended modelling the guarantee as a series of put options expiring at each period in which cash flows could mature, weighted by the probability of mortality, morbidity and pre-payment, using a version of the Black–Scholes pricing formula.  It recommended that the underlying price of the option should reflect the cost of deferred possession of the property, independent of any assumptions about future property growth, warning that many of the approaches presented to it implicitly assumed negative deferment rates.

United States

See also 
 Mortgage loan
 Equity loan
 Mortgage law
 UK mortgage terminology
 Reverse mortgage, the American equivalent
 PIV, the Italian equivalent

Notes 

Personal finance
Mortgage